Dno, also known as Grivochki (Гривочки), was a military air base in Dnovsky District, Pskov Oblast, Russia.

Dno air base was established by the Soviet Union prior to World War II, to serve the Soviet Air Force, with the 7th Air Army operating from there during the Winter War from 1939 to 1940. In 1941, Dno was captured by Nazi Germany during Operation Barbarossa and given the German name Flugplatz Griwotschki (Grivochki Airfield), who renovated and expanded it for use by the Luftwaffe. On March 15, 1943, the air base was raided by the Soviet 202nd High-speed Bomber Aviation Regiment, reportedly destroying 20 German planes and permanently crippling German air activity in the area. In 1944, Grivochki was destroyed by retreating Wehrmacht troops and was never rebuilt, and today nothing remains of the complex except a clearing.

References 

Soviet Air Force bases